Francis Joseph Prowse (4 August 1923 – 13 May 1999) was an Australian rules footballer who played with South Melbourne and Hawthorn in the Victorian Football League (VFL).	

Prowse served as a sapper in the Australian Army during World War II prior to his football career.

Notes

External links 

1923 births
1999 deaths
Australian rules footballers from Victoria (Australia)
Sydney Swans players
Hawthorn Football Club players